Racing Cycles–Kastro Team was a Greek UCI Continental cycling team.

References

UCI Continental Teams (Europe)
Cycling teams established in 2007
Cycling teams disestablished in 2014
Cycling teams based in Greece
2007 establishments in Greece
2014 disestablishments in Greece